The Villa Barbarigo is a patrician villa in the comune of Noventa Vicentina, in Province of Vicenza, northern Italy, also referred to as Villa Barbarigo Loredan Rezzonico reflecting the various marriage alliances among aristocratic Venetian families who have owned the house, is a rural palace built in the late 16th century.

In 1588, the Barbarigo family had commissioned the building from a generally unknown Veronese architect, who was familiar with Andrea Palladio's works. The structure is imposing for its height and elaborate adornment of loggias and porticos. The villa is notable for its fresco decorations by the artists as Antonio Foler, Antonio Vassilacchi (the Aliense), and Luca Ferrari from Reggio.

The villa Barbarigo is  used as the Town Hall of Noventa Vicentina.

Must not be confused with the Villa Barbarigo a Valsanzibio near Padua, that is renowned for its elaborate gardens and garden sculpture and statuary.

See also 
 Villa Barbarigo (Valsanzibio)

External links

Itinerary for Vicenza

Houses completed in the 16th century
Renaissance architecture in Veneto
Barbarigo, Novena Vicentina